Bolghur (also Romanized as Bolghūr, Balghoor, and Balghūr; also known as Bolqūr) is a village in Kardeh Rural District, in the Central District of Mashhad County, Razavi Khorasan Province, Iran. At the 2006 census, its population was 1,370, in 308 families.

References 

Populated places in Mashhad County